= Multi-time-step integration =

Numerical time-integration method

In numerical analysis, multi-time-step integration, also referred to as multiple-step or asynchronous time integration, is a numerical time-integration method that uses different time-steps or time-integrators for different parts of the problem. There are different approaches to multi-time-step integration. They are based on domain decomposition and can be classified into strong (monolithic) or weak (staggered) schemes. Using different time-steps or time-integrators in the context of a weak algorithm is rather straightforward, because the numerical solvers operate independently. However, this is not the case in a strong algorithm. In the past few years a number of research articles have addressed the development of strong multi-time-step algorithms. In either case, strong or weak, the numerical accuracy and stability needs to be carefully studied. Other approaches to multi-time-step integration in the context of operator splitting methods have also been developed; i.e., multi-rate GARK method and multi-step methods for molecular dynamics simulations.
